Kominono Dam is an arch dam located in Tokushima prefecture in Japan. The dam is used for power production. The catchment area of the dam is 270.8 km2. The dam impounds about 89  ha of land when full and can store 16750 thousand cubic meters of water. The construction of the dam was started on 1965 and completed in 1968.

References

Dams in Tokushima Prefecture
1968 establishments in Japan